The 2013–14 Manhattan Jaspers basketball team represented Manhattan College during the 2013–14 NCAA Division I men's basketball season. The Jaspers, led by third year head coach Steve Masiello, played their home games at Draddy Gymnasium and were members of the Metro Atlantic Athletic Conference. They finished the season 25–8, 15–5 in MAAC play to finish in second place. They were champions of the MAAC tournament to earn an automatic bid to the NCAA tournament where they lost in the second round to Louisville.

Roster

Schedule

|-
!colspan=9 style=";"| Exhibition

|-
!colspan=9 style=";"| Regular season

|-
!colspan=9 style=";"| MAAC tournament

|-
!colspan=9 style=";"| NCAA tournament

References

Manhattan Jaspers basketball seasons
Manhattan
Manhattan
Manhattan Jaspers men's basketball
Manhattan Jaspers men's basketball